The 1949–50 Michigan Wolverines men's basketball team represented the University of Michigan in intercollegiate basketball during the 1949–50 season.  The team finished the season in a tie for sixth place in the Big Ten Conference with an overall record of 11–11 and 4–8 against conference opponents.

Ernie McCoy was in his second year as the team's head coach.  Mack Supronowicz was the team's leading scorer with 278 points in 22 games for an average of 12.6 points per game.  Chuck Murray was the team captain.

Statistical leaders

See also
 1950 in Michigan

References

Michigan
Michigan Wolverines men's basketball seasons
Michigan Wolverines basketball
Michigan Wolverines basketball